Franklin Brigham Fay (January 24, 1821 – March 20, 1904) was a Massachusetts businessman and politician who served as the third Mayor of Chelsea, Massachusetts and in both houses of the Massachusetts legislature.

See also
 88th Massachusetts General Court (1867)

References
 Rand, John Clark, One of a Thousand: a Series of Biographical Sketches of One Thousand Representative Men, Boston, Massachusetts First National Publishing Company, p. 209, (1890).

Notes

Massachusetts in the American Civil War

1821 births
Republican Party Massachusetts state senators
Mayors of Chelsea, Massachusetts
Republican Party members of the Massachusetts House of Representatives
People from Southborough, Massachusetts
1904 deaths
Businesspeople from Massachusetts
19th-century American politicians
19th-century American businesspeople